Elected may refer to:

"Elected" (song), by Alice Cooper, 1973
Elected (EP), by Ayreon, 2008
The Elected, an American indie rock band

See also
Election